Ian Swan (14 July 1930 – 18 September 2004) was a Scottish international rugby union player. He played as a Wing.

Rugby union career

Amateur career

He played rugby at Madras College, his school.

Moving to University, he played rugby for St. Andrews University.

After university Swan joined the Royal Electrical and Mechanical Engineers in the army. He played for the Army Rugby Union side.

Swan played for London Scottish.

In the 1950s the Scotland selectors only considered selection for the national team if the players played in Scotland or for London Scottish. Yet Swan moved to play for the Leicester Tigers which he captained.

Swan then played for Coventry.

International career

He was capped for  17 times from 1953 to 1958.

In 1955 he turned down an opportunity to play for the British and Irish Lions.

Administration

Swan became a Vice President of Hawick then Jedforest.

Other sports

Tennis

Swan won a Scottish mixed doubles title. He represented the South of Scotland at tennis.

Golf

A keen golfer, he was a member of the Royal and Ancient Club in St Andrews from 1963. He won the Queen Victoria Jubilee Vase in 1985.

He was also a member of the Castelnaud-de-Gratecambe golf club in Lot et Garonne France.

Athletics

He represented the Army at athletics.

Business

He became a Director at Pringle in Hawick.

He later launched Kall-Kwik Printing franchises in Edinburgh.

References

1930 births
2004 deaths
Scottish rugby union players
Scotland international rugby union players
London Scottish F.C. players
University of St Andrews RFC players
Leicester Tigers players
Army rugby union players
Coventry R.F.C. players
Rugby union players from Fife
Rugby union wings